Chrysolarentia plesia, the plesia carpet, is a moth of the family Geometridae first described by Alfred Jefferis Turner in 1904. It is found in the Australian states of Victoria and Western Australia.

The wingspan is about 20 mm.

External links
Australian Faunal Directory

Moths of Australia
Euphyia
Moths described in 1904